Phil Bateman (born 8 September 1962) is a British former cyclist. He competed in the team time trial at the 1988 Summer Olympics.

References

External links
 

1962 births
Living people
English male cyclists
Olympic cyclists of Great Britain
Cyclists at the 1988 Summer Olympics
Sportspeople from Leeds